Love Ablish (born 3 December 1982) is an Indian First-class cricketer. He was formerly a member of Indian World Team in the Indian Cricket League Twenty20 competition.

He also played for the Ranji trophy.

References

Indian cricketers
Punjab, India cricketers
Punjab Kings cricketers
1982 births
Living people